The 2021–22 Saint Mary's Gaels men's basketball team represented Saint Mary's College of California during the 2021–22 NCAA Division I men's basketball season. The team were led by head coach Randy Bennett in his 21st season at Saint Mary's. The Gaels played their home games at the University Credit Union Pavilion in Moraga, California, as members of the West Coast Conference (WCC). They finished the season 26–8, 12–3 in WCC play to finish in second place. As the No. 2 seed in WCC tournament, they defeated Santa Clara in the semifinals, before losing to Gonzaga in the Championship. They received an at-large bid to the NCAA tournament as the No. 5 seed in the East Region, where they defeated Indiana in the first round before losing to UCLA in the second round.

Previous season
The Gaels finished the 2020–21 season 14–10, 4–6 in WCC play to finish in seventh place. They defeated Loyola Marymount before losing to Gonzaga in the semifinals of the WCC tournament. They received an at-large bid to the NIT where they lost to Western Kentucky in the first round.

Offseason

Departures
There were no Saint Mary's players that departed or transferred.

2021 recruiting class

Roster

Schedule and results

|-
!colspan=9 style=| Non-conference regular season

|-
!colspan=9 style=| WCC regular season

|-
!colspan=9 style=| WCC tournament

|-
!colspan=9 style=| NCAA tournament

Source

Rankings

*AP does not release post-NCAA Tournament rankings.^Coaches did not release a Week 1 poll.

Notes

References

Saint Mary's
Saint Mary's Gaels men's basketball seasons
Saint Mary's
Saint Mary's
Saint Mary's